The Gang's All Here (1941) is an American black-and-white feature film starring Frankie Darro,  Mantan Moreland, Marcia Mae Jones, and Jackie Moran in a story about a trucking company targeted by saboteurs. The film was directed by Jean Yarbrough, produced by Lindsley Parsons, and is one of several that paired Darro and Moreland.  The film is known as In the Night in the UK.

Cast
 Frankie Darro as Frankie O'Malley
 Marcia Mae Jones as Patsy Wallace
 Jackie Moran as Chick Daly
 Keye Luke as George Lee
 Mantan Moreland as Jefferson Smith
 Robert Homans as Pop Wallace
 Irving Mitchell as R. A. Saunders
 Ed Cassidy as Jack Norton
 Pat Gleason as Henchman Marty
 Jack Kenney as Henchman Dink
 Jack Ingram as Matt
 Laurence Criner as Ham Shanks

References

External links
 
 
 
 
 

1941 films
American crime drama films
American black-and-white films
Films directed by Jean Yarbrough
Trucker films
1941 crime drama films
1940s mystery drama films
Monogram Pictures films
American mystery drama films
Films produced by Lindsley Parsons
1940s English-language films
1940s American films